La antorcha encendida (English: The Flaming Torch) is a Mexican telenovela produced by Ernesto Alonso and Carlos Sotomayor for Televisa in 1996. It was the last historical telenovela produced by Televisa. The plot tells the Independence of Mexico, with an emphasis on historical accuracy. It was written by Fausto Zeron Medina in collaboration with Liliana Abud. It premiered on Canal de las Estrellas on May 6, 1996 and ended on November 15, 1996.

Leticia Calderón and Humberto Zurita starred as protagonists, while Juan Ferrara, Julieta Rosen, Alejandra Ávalos and Ari Telch starred as antagonists. Luis Gatica, Christian Bach, Alejandro Ruiz, Julio Beckles, Ernesto Laguardia, Mario Iván Martínez, Sergio Reynoso and the leading actors Patricia Reyes Spíndola, María Rivas, Angélica María, Ofelia Guilmáin, Carmen Salinas, María Rojo, Juan Peláez, Germán Robles, Luis Gimeno, Enrique Rocha, Aarón Hernán, Sergio Jiménez and Lorenzo de Rodas starred as stellar performances.

Plot
It has been three centuries of Spanish rule. Three hundred years in which the discounted of the population of New Spain has grown along with their suffering by injustice, exploitation, poverty and inequality. It is in this Mexico that begins to awaken which frames the love story between Mariano and Teresa.

United not only by affection, but especially by the desire to see their land free, their paths follow the history of Mexico's independence and freedom. The show depicts the lives of three families, de Soto, de Muñiz and the widowed Juana de Foncerada and her five adopted children. Mariano Foncerada will face Don Pedro to defend Teresa de Muñiz, whom he loves, and Pedro seeks to destroy him, without suspecting that Mariano is his son.

Cast
Leticia Calderón as Teresa de Muñiz
Humberto Zurita as Mariano Foncerrada
Juan Ferrara as Don Pedro de Soto
Julieta Rosen as Manuela de Soto
Ari Telch as Luis Foncerrada
Juan Peláez as Don Miguel Hidalgo y Costilla
Ernesto Laguardia as Gral. Ignacio Allende
Ofelia Guilmáin as Doña Macaria de Soto
Aarón Hernán as Father Julián de Ibarne
Angélica María as Doña Bernarda de Muñiz
 
Sergio Reynoso as Don José María Morelos y Pavón
María Rojo as Doña Josefa Ortiz de Domínguez
Patricia Reyes Spíndola as Doña Juana de Foncerrada
Carmen Salinas as Doña Camila de Foncerrada
Enrique Rocha as Virrey Félix María Calleja
René Casados as Agustín de Iturbide
Jerardo as Santiago de Soto
Sergio Sánchez as Don Jacinto de Muñiz
Ramón Abascal as Mariano Jiménez
Leonardo Daniel as Juan Aldama
David Ostrosky as Mariano Abasolo
Toño Mauri as Andrés Quintana Roo
Juan Carlos Bonet as Nicolás Bravo
Juan José Arjona as Francisco Xavier Mina
Christian Bach as María Ignacia "Güera" Rodríguez
Luis Gatica as Juan Foncerrada
Alejandro Ruiz as Diego Foncerrada
Julio Beckles as Lorenzo Foncerrada
Sergio Jiménez as Matías de Heredia
Alejandra Ávalos as Ángela
Mario Iván Martínez as Ignacio López Rayón
María Rivas as Virreina Inés de Jáuregui
Sergio Bustamante as Virrey José de Iturrigaray
Magda Karina as Brígida Almonte
Luis Gimeno as Guillermo Aguirre y Viana
Luis Xavier as Felipe Gómez Crespo
Roxana Saucedo as Ana María Huarte
Lorenzo de Rodas as Don Pablo de Irigoyen
Isaura Espinoza as Micaela
Roberto Ballesteros as Vicente Guerrero
Óscar Bonfiglio as Guadalupe Victoria
Julio Bracho as Simón Bolívar
Raúl Buenfil as Mariano Matamoros
Daniel Gauvry as Alexander Von Humboldt
Armando Araiza as Martín García de Carrasquero
Dacia Arcaráz as María Antonieta Morelos
Odiseo Bichir as Fray Servando Teresa de Mier
Luz María Jerez as Catalina de Irigoyen
Gilberto Román as Miguel Domínguez
Katia del Río as Leona Vicario
Leticia Sabater as Joaquina Torreo de Esteve
Maristel Molina as Doña Josefina Allué
Nando Estevané as Manuel Hidalgo
Claudio Sorel as Alcalde Ochoa
Humberto Elizondo as Hermenegildo Galeana
Sergio Klainer as Juan Ruiz de Apodaca
Marco de Carlos as Juan O'Donojú
Esteban Franco as El Pípila
Javier Díaz Dueñas as Pedro Moreno
Salvador Sánchez as Leonardo Bravo
Jorge Santos as José María Hidalgo
Humberto Dupeyrón as Mariano Hidalgo
Ramón Menéndez as Manuel Abad y Queipo
Alejandro Tommasi as José Nicolás de Michelena
Germán Robles as Ángel Avella
Antonio Medellín as "Amo" Torres
Manolo García as Miguel de Bataller
Roberto Blandón as Félix Flores Alatorre
Manuel Saval as José Manuel Fuentes
Natalia Esperón as Luz Agustina de las Fuentes
Claudia Ferreira as Francisca de la Gándara
Alberto Inzúa as Virrey Branciforte
José Carlos Teruel as Bondpland
Moisés Suárez as Arzobispo Lizana y Beausmont
Martín Barraza as Lázaro
Héctor Sáez as Juan Francisco Azcárate y Lezama
Eduardo Liñán as Manuel de la Cancha
Carlos Cámara as José Antonio Tirado
Rafael Amador as Cabo Ortega
Juan Carlos Colombo as Fray Vicente de Santa María
Andrés Bonfiglio as Gliberto Riano
Óscar Traven as Diego Berzábal
Miguel Pizarro as José de la Cruz
Isabel Benet as Ana de Soto
Fernando Sáenz as José María Mercada
Raúl Castellanos as Narciso Mendoza
Alejandro Gaytán as Indalesio Allende
Daniel Seres as Miguel Hidalgo (14 years old)
Blanca Ireri as Manuela de Soto (child)
Socorro Bonilla as Basilia
Lucía Guilmáin as China Poblana
Socorro Avelar as Chenta
Mercedes Pascual as Pilar
Aurora Clavel as Dominga
Israel Jaitovich as Álvaro de Urzúa
Leopoldo Frances as Dámaso
Jean Douverger as Lorenzo
Eduardo Santamarina as Héctor
Fabián Robles as José
Toño Infante

Awards

Soundtrack 
Available in Mercado Libre and Amazon.

References

External links

1996 telenovelas
Mexican telenovelas
1996 Mexican television series debuts
1996 Mexican television series endings
Spanish-language telenovelas
Television shows set in Mexico City
Televisa telenovelas